William Henry Kerr (10 June 1922 – 28 August 2014) was a British and Australian actor, comedian, and vaudevillian.   

Born in South Africa, he started his career as a child actor in Australia, before emigrating to Britain after the Second World War, where he developed a career as a performer in comedy, especially gaining notice in the radio version of Hancock's Half Hour. In 1979 Kerr returned to Australia and developed a second career as a character actor.

Biography
Kerr was born in Cape Town, South Africa, on 10 June 1922<ref name="Telegraph">Obituary: Bill Kerr, Daily Telegraph, 29 August 2014</ref> to an Australian performing arts family, growing up in Wagga Wagga, New South Wales, Australia. His career in show business began when he was very young. Wilton, his son, recalled: "His mum used him instead of using a prop, a baby prop, she actually used her son, her newborn son, so he was literally kind of born to do it."

Kerr began to work in radio for ABC in 1932, and continued performing child parts for about eight years. His first screen appearance was in Harmony Row (1933), where he gives a feisty performance as a juvenile delinquent alongside the great Australian vaudeville comedian George Wallace. Kerr's first dramatic role on screen was a high-profile one in the Cinesound film The Silence of Dean Maitland (1934), where he displays striking presence as a blind child. Kerr is one of the most important child performers in early Australian film. He saw service in the Australian army during the Second World War, and performed in theatrical shows at home and abroad and toured with his friend, the actor Peter Finch.

Career in Britain
After the war, Kerr moved to Britain in 1947. During the next few years he was regularly featured in the BBC radio series Variety Bandbox, part of the BBC Light Programme. Retaining his accent, an unusual choice for performers moving to Britain at this time, he was billed as "the boy from Wagga Wagga." A spokesman for the Australian town's museum said that this "struck an instant chord with the post-war British audience, who thought of 'Wagga Wagga' as a comically surreal, end of the earth, magical place somewhere left of Narnia." Harry Secombe described Kerr as having a "very laconic act" on the show, beginning his spots with the catchphrase "I'm only here for four minutes."

From 1954 to 1959, he had a regular role as an Australian lodger in the BBC radio comedy series Hancock's Half Hour. The series, with comedian Tony Hancock as the eponymous lead and also featuring Sid James, ran for six series. Initially sharper than Hancock's characterisation, Kerr's portrayal eventually developed into a more dim-witted character who became the butt of Hancock's jokes. Unlike James, Kerr did not feature in the television version of the Hancock series. Kerr also starred in the radio drama series The Flying Doctor (1958–63), regularly flying in and out of the fictitious Wollumboola base as he and his "doctor" colleague brought reprobates to justice in the outback.  Later, after Sid James had ended his professional partnership with Hancock, Kerr briefly resumed working with him in the first series of the television comedy Citizen James (1960). Kerr's other television appearances in Britain include a Doctor Who serial called The Enemy of the World (1968), with Patrick Troughton, and a long-running part in the early 1960s BBC-TV soap, Compact.

Kerr had much theatrical success in Britain, playing the Devil disguised as Mr Applegate in the first West End production of Damn Yankees, directed by Bob Fosse and first performed in March 1957. He appeared in a touring production of the play The Teahouse of the August Moon in 1956. He also worked with Spike Milligan and appeared in Milligan and John Antrobus's stage play The Bed-Sitting Room, which opened at the Mermaid Theatre on 31 January 1963. (a)pp.203–204, (b)pp.242–243 A subsequent production opened on 3 May 1967 at the Saville Theatre, and "a cast containing an unusually high proportion of Australian actors including Kerr and David Nettheim." In the 1969 London production of Play It Again, Sam at the Globe Theatre, Kerr played Humphrey Bogart.

In 1972 he co-starred with Anthony Newley in the Newley/Bricusse musical, The Good Old Bad Old Days, which enjoyed a run lasting 309 performances. Later he had a role (with Julia McKenzie and Una Stubbs) in the musical play Cole, dedicated to the work of Cole Porter and first staged at the Mermaid Theatre, London in July 1974. Kerr took the part of Bluey Notts, described as "an Australian bookie's clerk, a crude racialist", in The Melting Pot (1975). This was a sitcom written by Spike Milligan and Neil Shand, which was cancelled by the BBC after just one episode had been broadcast. He also appeared in several British films, such as The Dam Busters (1955) and The Wrong Arm of the Law (1963).

Return to Australia and later life
In 1979, Kerr returned to Australia and settled in Perth, Western Australia. Now concentrating on character roles, he played serious roles in Australian films, including Peter Weir's films Gallipoli (1981) and The Year of Living Dangerously (1982). In 1982 Kerr acted in the film The Pirate Movie.

He worked on the Australian stage during the 1980s, in musicals such as My Fair Lady, where he received excellent reviews as Alfred Doolittle. Kerr played real-life Australian military personalities on three occasions, appearing as bomber pilot Micky Martin in The Dam Busters (1955), as General John Monash in the TV mini-series Anzacs (1985) and as General Harry Chauvel in the film The Lighthorsemen (1986). In addition to his serious roles, he also continued to appear in comedies including the film The Coca-Cola Kid (1985) and Let's Get Skase (2001).

Kerr also appeared in Glenview High (1978–79) and the television comedy series Minty (1998) and played the part of Douglas Kennedy in the soap opera The Young Doctors (1980). He was seen as Dave Welles in the Australian mini-series Return To Eden (1983) where he helped Stephanie Harper after she had been attacked by a crocodile. He reprised his role of Dave Welles in the 1985 series of Return To Eden by giving Stephanie a deed to a worthless section of land in the Northern Territory.

Kerr provided the narration for the documentaries No Survivor - The Mysterious Loss of HMAS Sydney (1995) for the Nine Network,  Malice or Mutiny (2003) for the ABC), and a series for Discovery, released in the US as Animal X (originally Animal X Natural Mystery Unit).

On 26 January 2011, Kerr received the 2011 Walk of Honour in Wagga Wagga, which was unveiled on 17 May 2011. Kerr died in his family home in Perth, Western Australia, on 28 August 2014 at the age of 92. He was married three times.

Filmography

 Harmony Row (1933) - Leonard aka Sonny
 The Silence of Dean Maitland (1934) - Cyril Maitland Jr.
 Penny Points to Paradise (1951) - Digger Graves
 My Death Is a Mockery (1952) - Hansen
 Appointment in London (1952) - Bill Brown
 You Know What Sailors Are (1954) - Lt. Smart
 The Night My Number Came Up (1955) - The Soldier
 The Dam Busters (1955) - Flight Lieutenant H. B. Martin, D.S.O., D.F.C., A.F.C. 
 Port of Escape (1956) - Dinty Missouri
 The Shiralee (1957) - (uncredited)
 The Captain's Table (1959) - Bill Coke
 A Pair of Briefs (1962) - Victor - Club Owner
 The Wrong Arm of the Law (1963) - Jack Coombes
 Doctor in Distress (1963) - Australian Sailor
 Doctor in Clover (1966) - Digger
 A Funny Thing Happened on the Way to the Forum (1966) - Gladiator-in-Training
 Doctor Who serial The Enemy of the World (1967-1968, TV Series) - Giles Kent
 Tiffany Jones (1973) - Morton
 Ghost in the Noonday Sun (1973) - Giacomo
 Girls Come First (1975) - Hugh Jampton
 House of Mortal Sin (1976) - Mr. Davey
 The Young Doctors (1980, TV Series) - Douglas Kennedy
 Gallipoli (1981) - Jack
 Save the Lady (1982) - MacDuff
 The Pirate Movie (1982) - Major General
 The Year of Living Dangerously (1982) - Colonel Henderson
 Platypus Cove (1983) - Mr. Anderson
 Dusty (1983) - Tom Lincoln
 Return to Eden (1983, TV Mini-Series) - Dave Welles
 Razorback (1984) - Jake Cullen
 Vigil (1984) - Birdie
 The Settlement (1984) - Kearney
 White Man's Legend (1984) (TV Movie) 
 A Fortunate Life (1985, TV Mini-Series) - Narrator
 The Coca-Cola Kid (1985) - T. George McDowell
 Anzacs (1985, TV Mini-Series) - Gen. Monash / General Monash
 Relatives (1985) - Grandpa
 Return to Eden (1986, TV Series) - Dave Welles
 The Lighthorsemen (1987) - Gen. Sir Harry Chauvel
 Running from the Guns (1987) - Gilman
 Bushfire Moon (1987) - Trevor Watson
 Kokoda Crescent (1989) - Russ
 The New Adventures of Black Beauty (1990) - Samuel Burton (in this role he atypically spoke in an impeccable Received Pronunciation accent)
 Sweet Talker (1991) - 'Uncle' Cec
 The River Kings (1991, TV Mini-Series) - Captain Elijah
 Over the Hill (1992) - Maurice
 Snowy (1993)
 No Survivors - The Mysterious Loss of HMAS Sydney (1995, TV)
 Let's Get Skase (2001) - Mitchell Vendieks
 Changi (2001, TV Mini-Series) - Older Eddie
 Peter Pan (2003) - Fairy Guide
 Malice or Mutiny (2003, TV Series)
 Southern Cross (2004) - Tom Casely
 Animal X Natural Mystery Unit'' (2004–2006, TV Series)

References

External links
 

1922 births
2014 deaths
Australian male film actors
Australian male radio actors
Australian male television actors
South African emigrants to Australia
Male actors from Cape Town
People from Wagga Wagga
Australian Army personnel of World War II
Australian expatriates in the United Kingdom